Tony Resch is a retired lacrosse player, and current field and box lacrosse coach. He is the former head coach of the Philadelphia Wings of the National Lacrosse League from 1994 to 2001, and led the Wings to four Championships. Resch was named to the NLL Hall of Fame in 2008. Resch returned to coaching as the head coach of the Philadelphia Barrage of Major League Lacrosse.  Resch graduated from Yale University, where he was a two-time All-American and three-time First Team All-Ivy League player.

Resch also won a gold medal in the 1990 World Lacrosse Championship held in Perth, Australia as a member of Team USA.

He is currently a guidance counselor at La Salle College High School, in Wyndmoor, Pennsylvania.  He also serves as  Defensive Coordinator for the La Salle Lacrosse team, and assistant to head coach Rob Forster. La Salle has won five Pennsylvania State Championships during his coaching tenure. He resides in Flourtown, Pennsylvania with his wife, Mary, and their three sons, Patrick, Brendan, and Conor. Patrick played collegiate lacrosse at Dartmouth College as an undergraduate where he was a two-time captain, and later played at Duke University as a graduate student. Patrick currently plays for Chaos LC in the Premier Lacrosse League. Conor also played lacrosse at Yale University.

NLL playing career
Resch played as a defenseman with the Philadelphia Wings of the National Lacrosse League for six seasons, and was Team Captain for three seasons. He scored 12 goals and was credited with 10 assists during his playing career.  He was a member of the MILL Championship Philadelphia Wings teams in 1989 season and 1990 season.

NLL coaching career
Resch was the Wings Head Coach from 1994 to 2001.  Under the guidance of Resch, the Wings went to the playoffs every season he was head coach, and won the Championship in 1994, 1995, 1998, and 2001. As Head Coach of the Wings, Resch had a 59-27 regular season record.

MLL coaching career
Resch joined the Philadelphia Barrage of Major League Lacrosse as head coach in 2005.  In his first season as coach, the team finished 4-8, and missed the playoffs.

In his second season as Head Coach in 2006, Resch led the Barrage to the Major League Lacrosse Championship while finishing the regular season 10-2. The Barrage were repeat champions in 2007 with a record of 9-3.

Resch was an Assistant Coach for the Baltimore/Chesapeake Bayhawks during Championship seasons in 2002, 2012, and 2013.

International 
In addition to earning a Gold Medal as a player in the 1990 World Lacrosse Championship, Resch was an Assistant Coach for the Gold Medal-winning USA National Teams in 2010 in Manchester, England and 2018 in Netanya, Israel. He was also the Head Coach of the 2015 USA Indoor Team, that earned a Bronze Medal at the 2015 World Indoor Lacrosse Championship played on the Onondaga Reservation in New York.

Awards
In 2001, Resch was presented with the inaugural NLL Coach of the Year award. The award was renamed to the Les Bartley Award in 2004.  In 2006 and 2008, Resch was awarded the Warrior Major League Lacrosse Coach of the Year Award. Resch was inducted into the National Lacrosse League Hall of Fame in February, 2008. He was elected to the Pennsylvania Sports Hall of Fame City All Star Chapter in 2011 and the Montgomery County Chapter in 2018.

See also
 Lacrosse in Pennsylvania

References

Philadelphia Wings players
American lacrosse players
Yale Bulldogs men's lacrosse players
Living people
National Lacrosse League coaches
Major League Lacrosse coaches
National Lacrosse League major award winners
Major League Lacrosse major award winners
William Penn Charter School alumni
School counselors
Year of birth missing (living people)
Chesapeake Bayhawks coaches
High school lacrosse coaches in the United States